The men's 200 metres competition at the 1998 Asian Games in Bangkok, Thailand was held on 17–18 December at the Thammasat Stadium.

Schedule
All times are Indochina Time (UTC+07:00)

Results
Legend
DNF — Did not finish

Heats
 Qualification: First 4 in each heat (Q) and the next 4 fastest (q) advance to the semifinals.

Heat 1 
 Wind: +1.6 m/s

Heat 2 
 Wind: +1.1 m/s

Heat 3 
 Wind: +0.6 m/s

Semifinals
 Qualification: First 3 in each heat (Q) and the next 2 fastest (q) advance to the final.

Heat 1 
 Wind: +0.6 m/s

Heat 2 
 Wind: +0.6 m/s

Final 
 Wind: −0.4 m/s

References

Results (archived)
Results

Men's 00200 metres
1998